Lenita Mary Lane (December 16, 1901 – March 15, 1995) was an American stage and film actress. She appeared in several Broadway plays before turning to movies. Her more than two dozen movie appearances include The Mad Magician (1954) and The Bat (1959).

Personal life
Lane was born on December 16, 1901, in Parnassus, Pennsylvania. In April 1936 she married director Crane Wilbur. They remained married until his death in 1973. Lane died in Culver City, California on March 15, 1995, aged 93. She is buried with her husband at Forest Lawn Memorial Park in Hollywood Hills, California.

Filmography
 Murder by the Clock (1931) as Nurse
 Now I'll Tell (1934) as Virginia
 By Your Leave (1934) as Laura
 Imitation of Life (1934) as Mrs. Dale
 I Believed in You (1934) as Novelist
 We're Rich Again (1934) as Charmion
 The Gay Deception (1935) as Peg De Forrest
 Thunder in the Night (1935) as Guest
 Women Must Dress (1935) as Eve Sheldon
 Ginger (1935) as Society woman
 Federal Agent (1936) as Vilma
 A Dangerous Adventure (1937) as Frances Damon
 Girls on Probation (1938) as Marge
 The Women (1939) as Mrs. Spencer's friend
 Girl in 313 (1940) as Mrs. Whitman
 Free, Blonde and 21 (1940) as Mrs. Whitman
 Manhattan Heartbeat (1940) as Bentley's nurse
 I Want a Divorce (1940) as Wanda's friend
 For Beauty's Sake (1941) as Miss Sawter
 Man at Large (1941) as Nurse
 Dead Men Tell (1941) as Dr. Anne Bonney
 Castle in the Desert (1942) as Lucy Manderley
 Home Sweet Homicide (1946) as Mrs. Flora Sanford
 The Devil on Wheels (1947) as Mrs. Clark
 I Was a Communist for the FBI (1951) as Principal
 The Mad Magician (1954) as Alice Prentiss
 The Bat (1959) as Lizzie Allen

References

External links

 
 
 

1901 births
1995 deaths
20th-century American actresses
Actresses from Pennsylvania
People from New Kensington, Pennsylvania